Tom Rozum (born January 21, 1951 in Connecticut) is a Northern California-based American bluegrass mandolinist and singer. He is best known for his long-time collaboration with partner Laurie Lewis.

Music career
Originally from New England, Rozum moved to Berkeley from Arizona, where he played many kinds of traditional and original music with Summerdog and Flying South; and San Diego with the Rhythm Rascals. In 1986, he joined forces with Laurie Lewis as part of the original Grant Street Band. He plays primarily mandolin, but is also an accomplished fiddle, mandola, and guitar player. Rozum has been part of the staff of Bluegrass at the Beach, a music camp held in August on the Oregon Coast led by Laurie Lewis, since 1992.

A long-time fixture on the Bay Area music scene, Rozum is best known for "The Oak and the Laurel," his 1996 Grammy-nominated album of duets with Laurie Lewis. Rozum has also released a solo album "Jubilee" wherein he covers little-known country music by Merle Haggard, The Louvin Brothers and Bill Monroe interwoven with contemporary songs by David Olney and Mark Simos, among others.

References

External links
Official website
Bluegrass at the Beach website
 Tom Rozum interview with Mandolin Magazine

1951 births
Living people
American bluegrass musicians
American male singers
Old-time musicians
Singers from Connecticut
American bluegrass mandolinists
Country musicians from Connecticut